The Free Trade International Bridge is an international bridge which crosses the Rio Grande connecting the United States-Mexico border cities of Los Indios, Texas and Matamoros, Tamaulipas. The bridge is also known as "Los Indios-Lucio Blanco Bridge", "Puente Lucio Blanco-Los Indios", "Puente Internacional Libre Comercio" and "Los Indios Free Trade Bridge".

Description
The Free Trade International Bridge is currently owned and managed by Cameron County. The bridge was completed and opened in 1992.

Border crossing

The Los Indios Port of Entry opened in 1992 with the completion of the Free Trade International Bridge in 1992.  The crossing handles both passenger vehicles and commercial trucks.  Because of the length of the bridge and the rural location, there are very few pedestrians.

References

Toll bridges in Texas
Bridges completed in 1992
International bridges in Texas
International bridges in Tamaulipas
Buildings and structures in Cameron County, Texas
Transportation in Cameron County, Texas
Road bridges in Texas
Toll bridges in Mexico